Rüştü Hanlı (born 3 January 1997) is a Turkish footballer who plays as a defender for TFF Second League club Adıyaman FK.

Professional career
A youth academy product of Bursaspor, Hanlı made his professional debut with Busaspor in a 4-0 win over Antalyaspor on 29 October 2017.

On the last day of the January 2019 transfer market, Hanlı was one of 22 players on two hours, that signed for Turkish club Elazığspor. had been placed under a transfer embargo but managed to negotiate it with the Turkish FA, leading to them going on a mad spree of signing and registering a load of players despite not even having a permanent manager in place. In just two hours, they managed to snap up a record 22 players - 12 coming in on permanent contracts and a further 10 joining on loan deals until the end of the season. Hanlı was only loaned out to the club for the rest of the season.

References

External links
 
 
 
 Bursaspor Profile

1997 births
People from Osmangazi
Living people
Turkish footballers
Turkey youth international footballers
Turkey under-21 international footballers
Association football defenders
Bursaspor footballers
Adana Demirspor footballers
Elazığspor footballers
Vanspor footballers
Adanaspor footballers
24 Erzincanspor footballers
Süper Lig players
TFF First League players
TFF Second League players